Svenskt Tenn [English: Swedish Pewter] is a Swedish interior design store, founded in 1924 in Stockholm by Estrid Ericson, an art teacher and pewter artist from Hjo, Sweden. Since 1928, the company has been appointed as a royal warrant. Today, it is owned by the Kjell and Märta Beijer Foundation and all profit generated is donated to research in areas such as environmental sustainability, genetics, biomedicine and pharmaceuticals.

History

1924–1999 

Ericson's father's inheritance served as seed capital for starting the company. Together with pewter artist , she produced modern pewter objects and thus Svenskt Tenn quickly gained recognition as a brand of quality, eventually leading to a gold medal at the 1925 Exposition des Arts Décoratifs et Industriels in Paris. Further successes in the USA were following, beginning in 1927 with an exhibition of Swedish design at the Metropolitan Museum of Art in New York that also toured to Chicago and Detroit. As a result of her success, in 1927, the store moved from Smålandsgatan to larger premises on Strandvägen, where it is still located today.

At that time, the Swedish functionalist architects Uno Åhrén and Björn Trägårdh started to design for the company. In 1932, Ericson ordered the first furniture designs from the already well-established Austrian architect Josef Frank. Two years later, she hired Frank after he fled the burgeoning Nazism in Austria for Sweden at the age of 50 together with his Swedish wife Anna.

Svenskt Tenn's exhibition room at the world exhibitions in Paris (“Exposition des Arts et Techniques dans la Vie Moderne”) in 1937 and New York in 1939 was completely contrary to the ideal of the time with its bold contrasts in materials, colours and prints. The duo of Frank and Ericson received a great deal of attention and were quickly associated with the expression “Swedish Modern”.

Over time, the designer duo won many notable clients. In 1932, Sigvard Oskar Bernadotte commissioned Svenskt Tenn for a new interior design of his residence. Similarly, Ericson and Frank were commissioned to design the house of Anne Hedmark (Annes Hus) on the site of the Swedish sculptor Carl Milles’s studio and home.

During the Second World War, Josef Frank was forced into exile yet again. At the height of the war he fled to Manhattan, resulting in a number of new textile designs between 1941 and 1946. Sweden’s Prince Eugen was among those who took a great delight in them; he felt that the new designs actually exceeded those of the legendary print designer and Frank role model, William Morris.

After Frank died in 1967, Ericson ran the daily operations of the business until 1975. At the age of 81, she sold the company to the Kjell and Märta Beijer Foundation, which provides research grants within ecology, medicine and the preservation of Swedish interior design tradition. Ericson, however, remained as the managing director of the company. In 1979, Ann Wall took over her role and transformed Svenskt Tenn into a profitable business by modernising the product range, administration and organization, as well as renewing the marketing concept. Collaborations with selected new designers, as well as art and design schools, were also established under her direction.

1999 – today 

After Wall’s retirement twenty years later, the Kjell and Märta Beijer Foundation established the Ann Wall Design Prize in her honor as a part of Svenskt Tenn’s new business concept, which was “to preserve the spirit of Estrid Ericson and Josef Frank in a modern form.” In that context, the foundation in 2015 bought Frank's residence Villa Carlsten in Falsterbo, a town located at the southwestern tip of Sweden in Vellinge Municipality in Skåne. Frank had also designed a number of summer houses in that area.

Today, eighty percent of Svenskt Tenn's range consists of products that are of its own design. Josef Frank alone left behind 2,000 furniture sketches and about 160 textile designs. In 2009, Prince Carl Philip of Sweden debuted a silver cutlery collection at Svenskt Tenn. The following year, he presented a fireplace screen that he had co-designed.

Frank's designs are highly esteemed not the least among today's young and established designers and his textiles are a source of inspiration for many contemporary print designers both in Sweden and other countries. A famous fan of Frank is Apple designer Marc Newson.  Many of Franks furniture designs can be found in Swedish embassies around the globe, such as in Algiers and even the Consulate General in New York.

At auction, Frank's and Ericson's designs fetch high prices and can be found in the collections of the Museum of Modern Art in New York (MoMA) and the National Museum of Stockholm.

In May 2018,

Craftsmanship 

Inspired by the British Arts and Crafts designer William Morris, Ericson held the highest esteem for work that was crafted by hand. Today, large portion of Josef Frank's furniture is made at the same carpentry shops in Småland and Södermanland that have been producing them since the 1950s. The glass is made at, among other manufactories, the celebrated Reijmyre glassworks in Östergötland. All of Svenskt Tenn's textiles are made from 100 percent cotton and linen. The pewter workshops in Western Götaland in Sweden are also counted among Svenskt Tenn's long-time suppliers.

References 

Purveyors to the Court of Sweden
Design companies of Sweden
Interior design firms
Swedish brands
Design companies established in 1924
Swedish companies established in 1924
Companies based in Stockholm